Yaron Matras (born October 24, 1963) is a linguist at the University of Manchester specializing in  Romani and other languages, including Middle Eastern languages. He is one of the most prominent English-language Romani linguists and the author of several pioneering studies, including a book on Romani: A Linguistic Introduction (Cambridge University Press, 2002) and on Romani in Britain: The afterlife of a language (Edinburgh University Press, 2010), and A Grammar of Domari (De Gruyter Mouton, 2012). Matras organized the First International Conference on Romani Linguistics in 1993, and has served as Editor of the cross-disciplinary journal Romani Studies since 1999. He has coordinated the Romani Project at the University of Manchester since 1999, and in 2010 he launched the Multilingual Manchester project. His publications include a book on Language Contact (Cambridge University Press, 2009) and a co-edited trilogy on Mixed Languages, Linguistic Areas, and Grammatical Borrowing.

In 2012 Yaron Matras was awarded the Senior Fellowship of the Zukunftskolleg at the University of Konstanz.

References

External links 
 Bio. from The University of Manchester.

1963 births
Living people
Linguists of Kurdish
Linguists of Romani
Romani studies